Nurmesniemi is a surname. Notable people with the surname include:

Antti Nurmesniemi (1927–2003), Finnish designer
Vuokko Nurmesniemi (born 1930), Finnish designer

Finnish-language surnames